The Bravery Council of Australia Meeting 73 Honours List was announced by the Governor General of Australia on 16 August 2010.

Awards were announced for 
the Star of Courage,
the Bravery Medal,
Commendation for Brave Conduct and
Group Bravery Citation.

References

Orders, decorations, and medals of Australia
2010 awards